Nummi or NUMMI may refer to:
NUMMI (New United Motor Manufacturing, Inc.), a defunct automobile manufacturing company in Fremont, California, United States
 Tesla Factory (Gigafactory 0), the reused NUMMI factory building, sometimes still called "NUMMI"
 Nummi (Uusimaa), a former municipality (in the Finnish province of Uusimaa, in Finland) which merged with Pusula municipality into Nummi-Pusula municipality on January 1, 1981.
Nummi-Pusula, a former municipality of Finland between 1981 and 2012, which ceased to exist on 1 January 2013, when the municipalities of Nummi-Pusula and Karjalohja merged with Lohja.
Nummi (Turku), a district in Turku (in the province of Southwest Finland)
Nummus (plural: nummi), a Latin term meaning "coin"
Ron Nummi, American actor

See also
 Numi (disambiguation)